Grampian was one of nine former local government regions of Scotland created in 1975 by the Local Government (Scotland) Act 1973 and abolished in 1996 by the Local Government etc. (Scotland) Act 1994. The region took its name from the Grampian Mountains. 

It is now divided into the unitary council areas of Aberdeenshire, City of Aberdeen and Moray.

Geography 

Grampian had boundaries with the Highlands to the east (Inverness-shire, Nairnshire) and Tayside to the south (Angus, Perth and Kinross). It was made up of the historical counties of Aberdeenshire, City of Aberdeen, Kincardineshire and Morayshire in northeast Scotland. Moray included the historical county of Banffshire. Grampian was divided into five districts - Aberdeen, Banff and Buchan, Gordon, Kincardine and Deeside and Moray.

Aberdeen is the major city of the region. Other major towns are the former royal burgh of Elgin, the major fishing port of Peterhead, Fraserburgh, Inverurie, Westhill, Stonehaven, Forres, Ellon and Portlethen. Grampian Regional Council was based at Woodhill House, Westburn Road, Aberdeen.

Politics

Electoral History

Modern day use 
Grampian continues to have a regional NHS board. The region also had a regional fire and rescue service and Police service before they were merged into Scottish Fire and Rescue Service and Police Scotland respectively in 2013. Grampian also had its own Television region called Grampian Television until it was dissolved and incorporated in STV North in 2006.

Town twinning 

Aberdeen is twinned with Houston, Texas.

See also 

 Politics of Scotland
 Politics of the United Kingdom
 Subdivisions of Scotland

References

External links

 
Regions of Scotland
1975 establishments in Scotland
1996 disestablishments in Scotland